Tetrahydroxyborate is an inorganic anion with the chemical formula  or . It contributes no colour to tetrahydroxyborate salts. It is found in the mineral hexahydroborite, originally formulated .  It is one of the boron oxoanions, and acts as a weak base. The systematic names are tetrahydroxyboranuide (substitutive) and tetrahydroxidoborate(1−) (additive). It can be viewed as the conjugate base of boric acid.

Structure 

Tetrahydroxyborate has a symmetric tetrahedral geometry, isoelectronic with the hypothetical compound orthocarbonic acid  .

Chemical properties

Basicity 

Tetrahydroxyborate act as a weak Brønsted–Lowry base because it can assimilate a proton, yielding  boric acid with release of water:
 +    + 
It can also release a hydroxy anion , thus acting as a classical Arrhenius base:
   +  (pK = 9.14 to the left)
Thus, when boric acid is dissolved in pure (neutral) water, most of it will exist as tetrahydroxyborate ions.

With diols

In aqueous solution, the tetrahydroxyborate anion reacts with cis-vicinal diols (organic compounds containing similarly-oriented hydroxyl groups in adjacent carbon atoms)) such as mannitol, sorbitol, glucose and glycerol, to form anion esters containing one or two five-member  rings.

For example, the reaction with mannitol can be written as
  +    + 2  
  +    + 2 
Giving the overall reaction 
  + 2   [B(H(HCOH)2(HCO\s)2(HCOH)2H)2]-}} + 4 

These mannitoborate esters are fairly stable and thus depletes the tetrahydroxyborate from the solution.

The addition of mannitol to an initially neutral solution containing boric acid or borates lowers the pH enough for the be titrated by a strong base as NaOH, including with an automated a potentiometric titrator.  This is a reliable method to assay the amount of borate content present in the solution.

Other chemical reactions 

Upon treatment with a strong acid, a metal tetrahydroxyborate converts to boric acid and the metal salt.

Oxidation of tetrahydroxyborate gives the perborate anion :
 2 + 2 →  + 2

When heated to a high temperature, tetrahydroxyborate salts decompose to produce metaborate salts and water, or to produce boric acid and a metal hydroxide:
n  → (}) + 2n 
 →  + HO−

Production 

Tetrahydroxyborate salts are produced by treating boric acid with an alkali such as sodium hydroxide, with catalytic amounts of water. Other borate salts may be obtained by altering the process conditions.

Uses 

Tetrahydroxyborate can be used as a cross-link in polymers.

Occurrence 

The tetrahydroxyborate anion is found in Na[B(OH)4], Na2[B(OH)4]Cl and CuII[B(OH)4]Cl.

See also 

 Borate
 Tetrafluoroborate

References 

Borates
Anions